Cyperus hayesii is a species of sedge that is native to parts of Central America.

See also 
 List of Cyperus species

References 

hayesii
Plants described in 1925
Flora of Costa Rica
Flora of Guatemala
Flora of Honduras
Flora of Panama
Taxa named by Paul Carpenter Standley